Myrmex knulli is a species of antlike weevil in the beetle family Curculionidae. It is found in North America.

Subspecies
These two subspecies belong to the species Myrmex knulli:
 Myrmex knulli chiricahuae
 Myrmex knulli knulli

References

Further reading

 
 

Curculioninae
Articles created by Qbugbot
Beetles described in 1954